is a combined junior and senior high school in Hakodate, Hokkaido, Japan.

History

Hakodate La Salle senior high school was established in Hakodate in 1960. Hakodate La Salle junior high school was established in 1999.

References

External links 
 
 Alumni association website

High schools in Hokkaido